Adela of Normandy, of Blois, or of England (c. 1067 – 8 March 1137), also known as  in Roman Catholicism, was a daughter of William the Conqueror and Matilda of Flanders who later became the countess of Blois, Chartres, and Meaux by marriage to Stephen II of Blois. Her husband greatly benefited from the increased social status and prestige that came with such a marriage. She brought with her not only her bloodline but a dowry of money and other movable goods from the prodigious store of Anglo-Norman wealth. She was regent of Blois during the absence of her spouse in 1096–1100 and 1101–02, and during the minority of her son from 1102 until 1120. Adela was the mother of King Stephen of England and Bishop Henry of Winchester.

Early life

It is generally believed that Adela was born between 1066 and 1070 after her father's accession to the English throne. Her royal blood marked her as noble in the eyes of her peers. She was the favorite sister of King Henry I of England, and they were probably the youngest of the Conqueror's children. Adela was a high-spirited and educated woman with a knowledge of Latin. She had three older brothers and one younger, and thus she would not inherit her father's honors; however her bloodline would be a valuable asset to a spouse.

Adela married Stephen Henry, son and heir to the count of Blois, between 1080 and 1083, around her fifteenth birthday. Stephen was nearly twenty years her senior.  Stephen inherited Blois, Chartres and Meaux upon his father's death in 1089, as well as lands and right in parts of Berry and Burgundy. The Thibaudian dynasty had other possessions east of Paris, and by the end of Adela's life these were coalescing into the county of Champagne.  While Theobald IV takes most of the credit for the emergence of that principality, Adela helped lay its foundations. Adela and her husband had a relationship based on trust and mutual respect, if not affection, and she made decisions along with Stephen.  She swore, for instance, to bind herself and her husband to protect the bishop of Chartres, then in a dispute with the king of France.

First regency
Stephen-Henry joined the First Crusade in 1096, along with his brother-in-law Robert Curthose. Adela filled in as regent for her husband during his extended absence as a leader of the First Crusade (1095–1098) as well as during his second expedition in 1101. Stephen's letters to Adela form a uniquely intimate insight into the experiences of the Crusade's leaders and show that he trusted Adela to rule as regent while he was on crusade.

Adela's regency included granting monks the right to build new churches, as well as other charters. Adela also worked with Ivo of Chartres at various points, exchanging letters throughout her regency to discuss matters such as the control of misbehaving nuns and larger issues such as disputes about sworn oaths. While her husband was away, Adela would continue to tour their lands, settling disputes, promoting economic growth, and even commanding knights to go to battle with the king. This however was not unique, as during the crusades it was common for noble women to take upon themselves the duties of their male counterparts.

The Count of Blois returned to France in 1100 bringing with him several cartloads of maps, jewels and other treasures, which he deposited at Chartres. According to Orderic Vitalis, when Stephen-Henry abandoned the First Crusade returning to France in ignominy, "Adela constantly berated him, even during their love-making", urging him to return to the Holy Land. He was under an obligation to the pope for agreements made years earlier and returned to Antioch to participate in the crusade of 1101. He was ultimately killed in a last stand after the Battle of Ramla in 1102. The image of Adela persuading her ease-loving husband to redeem his reputation through action has proved popular with historians attempting to account for the crusader motivations.

Second regency
Adela continued to act as regent after her husband's death and through her son Thibaud's early rule until her retirement in 1120. Even after Thibaud came of age and no longer needed a regent, Adela continued to issue charters and act as co-ruler of many parts of their land.  Adela did not secure a marriage alliance for Thibaud, who did not get married until after Adela's retirement, which helped to maintain her power and influence over both her son and her lands.

Adela, a devout Benedictine sympathizer, employed several high-ranking tutors to educate her children.  Her youngest son, Henry, was conceived during the single year Stephen was in France between crusading duties.  At two years of age Henry was pledged to the Church at Cluny Abbey, Saône-et-Loire, France, as an oblate child, that is, he was dedicated to the service of God, according to medieval practice. Henry went on to be appointed Abbot of Glastonbury and Bishop of Winchester. In that capacity, he sponsored hundreds of constructions including bridges, canals, palaces, forts, castles, and whole villages. In addition, Bishop Henry built dozens of abbeys and chapels and sponsored books including the treasured Winchester Bible.

In 1105, after St Anselm visited her during a sickness, she was responsible for communicating the archbishop's earnestness in threatening excommunication to her brother Henry I. Orderic Vitalis praises her as a "wise and spirited woman" who ably governed her husband's estates and her own. Adela's power and interests are reflected in letters collected, they demonstrate her religiosity and intellect.  In one such letter to the public from 1104, Adela gifts a monastery a portion of land with all the wildlife inhabiting it, but she reserves the power to pass judgment upon crimes committed in the area.  She also makes sure to mark her place as a woman, tying herself to not only her late husband but her sons.

Adela quarrelled with her eldest son William and despite his previously being named heir-designate, she appointed his younger brother Theobald to replace him as heir in 1107. Another son, Stephen of Blois, moved to London in 1111 to join the court of his uncle, King Henry I (Beauclerc), and became his favorite. Upon Beauclerc's death in Normandy (1135), Stephen seized the English throne from  Holy Roman Empress Dowager Matilda, King Henry I's daughter, whom the monarch had named as his successor.  This started a protracted civil war in England that lasted nearly twenty years.

Retirement
Adela retired to Marcigny Convent in 1120. Though she may have considered retiring to an abbey in Normandy where members of her family, including sisters and nieces, may have already been living, Adela was drawn to and chose the larger, more prestigious convent at Marcigny near her son Henry at Cluny Abbey. Adela may have acted as prioress within the community at Marcigny, though this is not certain. She continued to interact and communicate with her children and the ecclesiastical leaders of lands that she had once ruled, maintaining her influence over the area. In one instance, Adela sent letters to both her son Thibaud  and Geoffrey, bishop of Chartres, reminding them of her settlement of a monastic case. In these letters she reminds her son how his father and she felt about alms gifting to monasteries.

Later that same year, her daughter Lucia-Mahaut drowned in the wreck of the White Ship alongside her husband. Adela lived long enough to see her son Stephen on the English throne, though any response she may have had to this development has been lost. She likely took pride in the ascension of her youngest child, Henry of Blois, to the bishopric of Winchester in 1129.  After her death in 1137 at Marcigny, prayers were offered at a number of churches that she had endowed personally or had recognized at some point during her life. Her money, influence, and entry into the convent resulted in Adela becoming a saint of the Catholic Church.

Issue
Adela and Stephen's children are listed here in probable birth order. Their birth order is uncertain.  
William, Count of Sully
Theobald II, Count of Champagne
Odo of Blois 
 Adela, married Milo II of Montlhéry
Stephen, King of England
Lucia-Mahaut, married Richard d'Avranches, 2nd Earl of Chester. Both drowned on 25 November 1120 in the White Ship disaster.
Agnes, married Hugh III of Le Puiset and were parents to Hugh de Puiset, Bishop of Durham
 Alix, married Renaud III of Joigny 
Henry, Bishop of Winchester (1096–1171), an oblate child raised at Cluny Abbey in Saône-et-Loire, France
Eleanor of Champagne
Some of the daughters may have been step-daughters of Adela, rather than biological children. It is known that Adela had five biological sons and may have had three or more daughters, though not all of the daughters were necessarily Adela's biological children. The daughters are not mentioned by name during their youth, only appearing when they reached marriageable age and played an important part in building alliances.

Legacy
Adela is a saint in the Roman Catholic church. Her feast day is 24 February. She was deeply religious and supported scholars and poets. Throughout her life she generously endowed various abbeys and churches, helping to expand and preserve the culture and art of her time.

In fiction 
Adela was portrayed by Nike Arrighi in the two-part BBC TV play Conquest (1966), about her father's conquest of England, part of the series Theatre 625.

In art
Adela is a featured figure on Judy Chicago's installation piece The Dinner Party, being represented as one of the 999 names on the Heritage Floor.

Ancestry

Note

References

Further reading
Chicago, Judy. The Dinner Party: From Creation to Preservation. London: Merrell (2007). 
Evergates, Theodore, ed. Aristocratic Women in Medieval France. Philadelphia: University of Pennsylvania Press (1999). 
LoPrete, Kimberly. Adela of Blois: Countess and Lord (c.1067–1137). Dublin: Four Courts Press (2007). 
LoPrete, Kimberly. "Adela of Blois and Ivo of Chartres: Piety, Politics and Peace in the Diocese of Chartres'." Anglo-Norman Studies xiv (1992): 131–152
Parsons, John and Bonnie Wheeler. Medieval Mothering (New Middle Ages). New York: Routledge (1999). 
Schaus, Margaret, ed. Women and Gender in Medieval Europe: An Encyclopedia. New York: Routledge (2006).

External links

 (en)
Women's Biography: Adela, countess of Blois, Chartres, and Meaux

1060s births
1137 deaths
Female saints of medieval France
11th-century Christian saints
11th-century women rulers
11th-century English people
11th-century French people
12th-century Christian saints
12th-century women rulers
12th-century English people
12th-century French people
English princesses
House of Normandy
Countesses of Chartres
Medieval French saints
Roman Catholic royal saints
Female saints of medieval England
Medieval English saints
11th-century English women
11th-century French women
12th-century English women
12th-century French women
Children of William the Conqueror
Anglo-Normans
Daughters of kings